Yuri Antonio Costa da Silva (born 8 January 1996), simply known as Yuri, is a Brazilian footballer who plays for Portuguesa RJ as either a left back or a midfielder.

Honours
Botafogo
Campeonato Brasileiro Série B: 2015
Campeonato Carioca: 2018

Lugano
Swiss Cup: 2021–22

Career statistics

Club

References

External links

1996 births
Living people
Footballers from Rio de Janeiro (city)
Brazilian footballers
Association football defenders
Association football midfielders
Campeonato Brasileiro Série A players
Campeonato Brasileiro Série B players
Swiss Super League players
Botafogo de Futebol e Regatas players
Criciúma Esporte Clube players
Santa Cruz Futebol Clube players
Figueirense FC players
FC Lugano players
Brazilian expatriate footballers
Brazilian expatriate sportspeople in Switzerland
Expatriate footballers in Switzerland